Meshginshahr (electoral district) is the 3rd electoral district in the Ardabil Province of Iran. It has a population of 151,156 and elects 1 member of parliament.

1980
MP in 1980 from the electorate of Meshginshahr. (1st)
 Ahmad Hemmati

1984
MP in 1984 from the electorate of Meshginshahr. (2nd)
 Ahmad Hemmati

1988
MPs in 1988 from the electorate of Meshginshahr. (3rd)
 Ahmad Hemmati

1992
MP in 1992 from the electorate of Meshginshahr. (4th)
 Ahmad Hemmati

1996
MP in 1996 from the electorate of Meshginshahr. (5th)
 Mahmud Norizadeh

2000
MP in 2000 from the electorate of Meshginshahr. (6th)
 Khalil Aghaei

2004
MPs in 2004 from the electorate of Meshginshahr. (7th)
 Vali Maleki

2008
MP in 2008 from the electorate of Meshginshahr. (8th)
 Younes Asadi

2012
MP in 2012 from the electorate of Meshginshahr. (9th)
 Younes Asadi

2016

Notes

References

Electoral districts of Ardabil Province
Meshgin Shahr County
Deputies of Meshginshahr